Dowling is an unincorporated community in Wood County, Ohio, United States.

Notable people
 Wilson W. Brown was a soldier and recipient of the Medal of Honor for his role in the Great Locomotive Chase during the American Civil War.

Notes

Unincorporated communities in Wood County, Ohio
Unincorporated communities in Ohio